Helmut Arthur Abt (born 26 May 1925) is a German-born American astrophysicist, having worked at the National Optical Astronomy Observatory and an Elected Fellow of the American Association for the Advancement of Science. He is astronomer emeritus at Kitt Peak National Observatory.

Helmut was born in Helmstedt, Germany, then his family emigrated to the United States when he was two. He received his B.S. in Mathematics from Northwestern University in 1946, M.S. in Physics from Northwestern University in 1948, and became the first person to be awarded a Ph.D. in astrophysics at California Institute of Technology in 1952 for his thesis work on W Virginis.

He then spent a year at Lick Observatory. From 1953 to 1959 he was assistant professor at Yerkes Observatory, part of the University of Chicago, then joined the staff of the Kitt Peak National Observatory as an astronomer, where he remained until 2000. From 1966 to 1968, he was President of the Astronomical Society of the Pacific. During 1971–1999 he was managing editor of the Astrophysical Journal.

His areas of research include stellar rotation; binary stars, including spectroscopic binaries; stellar classification; and bibliometrics of astronomy publications.

Awards and honors 
He was awarded the George Van Biesbroeck Prize in 1997. The main-belt asteroid 9423 Abt, discovered by Spacewatch at Kitt Peak National Observatory in 1996, and Abt's star (SV Crateris/ HD 98088/ ADS 8115) in the constellation Crater were named in his honor.

References

External links 

 Oral History interview transcript for Helmut Abt on 28 and 29 October 1999, American Institute of Physics, Niels Bohr Library and Archives

1925 births
Living people
American astrophysicists
Northwestern University alumni
California Institute of Technology alumni
Fellows of the American Association for the Advancement of Science
Fellows of the American Astronomical Society
German emigrants to the United States
The Astrophysical Journal editors